"Tipsy" is the debut single by American rapper J-Kwon, released through So So Def Recordings and Arista Records on January 12, 2004, as the lead single from his debut studio album, Hood Hop (2004). Written by J-Kwon alongside Joe Kent and Mark Williams, "Tipsy" was produced by American production team Trackboyz.

Background
It peaked at number 2 on the Billboard Hot 100 on April 17, 2004, after 14 weeks on the chart, and it peaked at number 2 on the Hot R&B/Hip-Hop Singles & Tracks. Outside the United States, "Tipsy" peaked within the top ten of charts in Australia and the United Kingdom, but on the UK R&B singles chart the song had peaked at number 1. To date, "Tipsy" has been J-Kwon's biggest and only hit, with his next single "You and Me" being a moderate success peaking in the Top 20 on the U.S. Rap chart. J-Kwon was 17 at the time of the release of "Tipsy", a song considered an ode to underage drinking.

Music video
In the video, J-Kwon holds a house party. The video pays homage to House Party, Risky Business, and the music video of the song "Gin and Juice". So So Def's Daz Dillinger, Jermaine Dupri, Da Brat, and Derrty's Murphy Lee make cameo appearances. Comedian and actor Lavell Crawford also makes an appearance at the end and beginning as J-Kwon's father.

Remix
The official remix (frequently referred to as "Still Tipsy") features fellow St. Louis rappers Chingy and Murphy Lee. Sway DaSafo sampled the song's beat for "Pepsi", an anti-drinking spoof song on his debut album.

In popular culture
 "Tipsy" was featured in the films Breakin' All the Rules, White Chicks and Soul Plane, as well as in the video game L.A. Rush.  It was also heard during a club scene in the episode "Moral Midgetry", from season 3 of The Wire. J-Kwon performed the song on the Season 29 finale of Saturday Night Live.
 A club remix of "Tipsy" was featured in the 2012 film, Project X and This is the End. In 2015, it was featured in the movie Sisters.

Charts

Weekly charts

Year-end charts

Certifications

Release history

References

2003 songs
2004 debut singles
J-Kwon songs
So So Def Recordings singles
Songs about alcohol
Songs written by J-Kwon
Arista Records singles